Lee Young-Sun (born 21 February 1974) is a retired female javelin thrower from South Korea. Her personal best throw is 58.87 metres, achieved at the 2002 Asian Games in Busan.

International competitions

* New model javelin

References

1974 births
Living people
South Korean female javelin throwers
Olympic athletes of South Korea
Athletes (track and field) at the 1992 Summer Olympics
Athletes (track and field) at the 1996 Summer Olympics
Athletes (track and field) at the 2000 Summer Olympics
Asian Games gold medalists for South Korea
Asian Games silver medalists for South Korea
Asian Games medalists in athletics (track and field)
Athletes (track and field) at the 1994 Asian Games
Athletes (track and field) at the 1998 Asian Games
Athletes (track and field) at the 2002 Asian Games
Universiade medalists in athletics (track and field)
Medalists at the 1994 Asian Games
Medalists at the 1998 Asian Games
Medalists at the 2002 Asian Games
Universiade gold medalists for South Korea
Universiade bronze medalists for South Korea
Medalists at the 1993 Summer Universiade
Medalists at the 1995 Summer Universiade
Competitors at the 1997 Summer Universiade